Beaucarnea pliabilis is a tree in the family Asparagaceae, native to the Yucatán Peninsula.

Distribution and habitat
Beaucarnea pliabilis is endemic to the Yucatán Peninsula, including parts of Mexico, Belize and Guatemala.

Conservation
Beaucarnea pliabilis has been assessed as vulnerable on the IUCN Red List. It is threatened by conversion of land for urban development and cattle farming. Fires and hurricanes pose an additional threat in the region. The species is increasingly threatened by illegal harvesting for the ornamental plant trade. The tree's range includes numerous protected areas, however population decline has continued.

References

pliabilis
Flora of Campeche
Flora of Quintana Roo
Flora of Yucatán
Flora of Belize
Flora of Guatemala
Plants described in 1880
Taxa named by John Gilbert Baker
Taxa named by Joseph Nelson Rose